HMS Worcester was a 50-gun fourth rate ship of the line of the Royal Navy, launched at Southampton on 31 May 1698.

The vessel was rebuilt by Joseph Allin the elder at Deptford according to the 1706 Establishment at Deptford Dockyard and relaunched on 31 August 1714. She served in the North Sea, including participation in the May 1719 capture of Eilean Donan Castle during the Jacobite rising of 1719. Worcester was broken up in 1733.

Notes

References

Lavery, Brian (2003) The Ship of the Line - Volume 1: The development of the battlefleet 1650-1850. Conway Maritime Press. .

Ships of the line of the Royal Navy
1690s ships